Uncle Donald's Ants is a 1952 animated short film featuring Donald Duck.  It was released by Walt Disney Productions.

Plot
Donald Duck accidentally drops some sugar on the sidewalk, attracting ants.  Eventually the ants take over his home, stealing a cake, building a bridge from the maple syrup to their hill, and multiple other incidents that incite Donald's temper.

Voice cast
Clarence Nash as Donald Duck
Pinto Colvig as the ants

Home media
The short was released on November 11, 2008 on Walt Disney Treasures: The Chronological Donald, Volume Four: 1951-1961.

References

External links
 
 

1952 films
1952 animated films
1950s Disney animated short films
Donald Duck short films
Films produced by Walt Disney
1950s English-language films
1950s American films